Leptaroa is a genus of moths in the subfamily Lymantriinae. The genus was erected by George Hampson in 1910.

Leptaroa is seen as a synonym of Chrysocyma Hampson, 1905 by The Global Lepidoptera Names Index and Lepidoptera and Some Other Life Forms. The list below comes from Afromoths.

Species
Leptaroa deleta Hering, 1926
Leptaroa fulvicolora Camera Hampson, 1910
Leptaroa jordani Hering, 1926
Leptaroa ochricoloria Strand, 1911
Leptaroa paupera Hering, 1926

References

Lymantriinae